Tara Erraught (born 1986, Dublin, Ireland) is an Irish mezzo-soprano, a graduate of the Royal Irish Academy of Music (RIAM).

Erraught is known for her work with Bavarian State Opera, for which she has been given a  award. She stepped in on five-days' notice, learning the role of Romeo in Bellini's I Capuleti e i Montecchi at the Bayerische Staatsoper in 2011. In the seasons since, Erraught has sung a world premiere, made her US opera debut, numerous role debuts, and successfully toured North America twice.

Career
Erraught has performed a wide variety of operatic roles including an acclaimed American opera debut with the Washington National Opera as Angelina in La Cenerentola; role debuts as Carlotta in Strauss's Die Schweigsame Frau, Christa in Janáček's The Makropulos Affair, Despina (having previously sung the role of Dorabella) in Mozart's Così fan tutte, Prince Orlovsky in Die Fledermaus, Cherubino in Le nozze di Figaro, as well as
singing Hänsel in Hänsel und Gretel with the Bayerische Staatsoper; Rosina in Rossini's The Barber of Seville. She created the role of Kitty in the world premiere of Iain Bell's A Harlot's Progress at the Theater an der Wien. In September 2017, she made her Metropolitan Opera debut singing the role of Nicklausse in Les contes d'Hoffmann and sang the role of Hänsel there later that season.

Octavian controversy
She was the subject of controversial reviews when she sang the role of Octavian in a production by Richard Jones of Der Rosenkavalier at Glyndebourne in 2014. Critics including Andrew Clark (in the Financial Times), Rupert Christiansen (in The Daily Telegraph), and Richard Morrison (in The Times) felt her physique and costume made her an implausible young male lover in this breeches role opposite Kate Royal's Marschallin. The reviews were described as "vicious" by Donal Lynch in the Irish Independent. Several other critics and performers supported Erraught.

Discography
With the Irish Baroque Orchestra she has recorded music from 18th century Ireland including several arias written for the soprano castrato Giusto Fernando Tenducci.

Honours
Erraught has received several honours and awards. In 2013 the Bavarian government bestowed upon her the prestigious Pro meritis scientiae et litterarum in recognition for outstanding contribution to the arts. Erraught is only the fifth musician, and the youngest recipient, to be honoured with the annual award since its inception in 2000. In March 2010, Erraught was the recipient of Dublin's National Concert Hall's Rising Star Award. Other honours include first prize in the Jakub Pustina International Singing Competition in the Czech Republic, along with the Zdar nad Sazavou Audience Prize in 2008. In that same year she was awarded both the Houston Grand Opera Prize and the Washington National Opera Prize at the International Hans Gabor Belvedere Singing Competition in Vienna. In 2007, Erraught won the Dermott Troy Award for the Best Irish Singer.

References

External links

Tara Erraught, mezzo-soprano, concert details 24 April 2013, biography, Vancouver Recital Society

1986 births
Living people
Singers from Dublin (city)
Alumni of the Royal Irish Academy of Music
Irish expatriates in Germany
21st-century Irish women opera singers
Irish mezzo-sopranos
Operatic mezzo-sopranos